Josh Turner is an American country music artist. His discography comprises nine studio albums and seventeen singles, all released on MCA Nashville. Turner's first three albums are all certified by the Recording Industry Association of America. His 2003 debut Long Black Train is certified platinum, 2006's Your Man is certified 2× Platinum, and 2007's Everything Is Fine is certified gold. Of his singles, the highest-charting are "Your Man", "Would You Go with Me", "Why Don't We Just Dance", and "All Over Me"—all of which reached number one on the US country singles charts. "Why Don't We Just Dance" is also his highest peak on the Billboard Hot 100, at 35. "Time Is Love"  and "Long Black Train" are certified gold as singles, while "Your Man", "Would You Go with Me", "Why Don't We Just Dance" are certified platinum.

Studio albums

2000s

2010s and 2020s

Compilation albums

Live albums

Singles

2000s

2010s

Other contributions
"Tears of God" – America Will Always Stand album
"In My Dreams" – Today – Tomorrow – Forever: A Collection Of Country Love Songs, Walmart Exclusive
"First Noel" – 2004 Target Christmas, Target Exclusive
"Softly and Tenderly" – Amazing Grace 3: A Country Salute To Gospel
"Long Black Train" – Three Wooden Crosses
"Good Woman Bad" – An Unfinished Life film
"Hard Headed" – iTunes exclusive single
"Almost Persuaded" – Billy: The Early Years
"When I Paint My Masterpiece" – Endless Highway: The Music of The Band
"Don't Fence Me In" – Kit Kittredge: An American Girl (Original Motion Picture Soundtrack)
"T.I.M.E" – Anniversary Collection (Randy Travis album)
"Gotta Go Back" – Inspired: Songs of Faith & Family (Joey + Rory album)
"Why I Love Christmas" – Duck The Halls: A Robertson Family Christmas
"Back From Gone" - "Forever My Girl" Soundtrack

Music videos

Notes

References

Country music discographies
 
 
Discographies of American artists